Lilli Lentz (born 13 September 1924) is a Danish archer who represented Denmark at the 1972 Summer Olympic Games in archery.

Career 

She competed in the 1972 Summer Olympic Games in the women's individual event and finished 29th with a score of 2218 points.

References

External links 

 Profile on worldarchery.org

1924 births
Living people
Danish female archers
Olympic archers of Denmark
Archers at the 1972 Summer Olympics
20th-century Danish women